Zawadówka may refer to the following places:
Zawadówka, Gmina Chełm in Lublin Voivodeship (east Poland)
Zawadówka, Gmina Rejowiec in Lublin Voivodeship (east Poland)
Zawadówka, Włodawa County in Lublin Voivodeship (east Poland)